Jim Fairlie (born 1940) is a Scottish politician and financial analyst.

Fairlie was educated at the University of Dundee. He joined the Scottish National Party (SNP) in 1955, and was elected to its National Executive in the early 1970s.  At the February and October 1974, and 1979 general elections, he stood unsuccessfully for the party in Dundee West. At the time he was described as a student teacher and had previously been vice-chair of the Perth and East Perthshire SNP Association. In 1979, he became Vice Chairman for Policy, and from 1981 to 1984, he was Deputy Leader and Senior Vice Chairman of the party.  He stood unsuccessfully in Dunfermline West at the 1983 general election and Perth and Kinross in 1987, and also wrote a column in the Scots Independent newspaper.

In 1989 Fairlie was selected to stand again in Perth and Kinross, but he resigned from the SNP in 1990, objecting to its "Independence in Europe" slogan and support for the European Community.  In the 2000s, he joined the Free Scotland Party, acting as its Media Liaison Officer. He stood unsuccessfully for the party in Perth at the 2007 Scottish Parliament election.

His son, also named Jim, was elected as an MSP at the 2021 Scottish Parliament election; another son Andrew who died in 2019 was a chef.

On 3 August 2021, The Herald announced that Fairlie had joined Restore Scotland (now Sovereignty).

References

1940 births
Alumni of the University of Dundee
Living people
Scottish National Party politicians
Scottish columnists
Scottish National Party parliamentary candidates